The Bishop of Mauritius has been  the Ordinary of the Anglican Church in Mauritius in the Indian Ocean since its inception in 1854. The current bishop is Ian Ernest, who was also the Archbishop of the Indian Ocean until 2017.

Bishops
1854 Vincent William Ryan
1869 Thomas Goodwin Hatchard
1870 Henry Constantine Huxtable
1872 Peter Sorenson Royston
1891 William Walsh
1898–1903 Walter Ruthven Pym
1904 Francis Gregory
1919 Cyril Golding-Bird
1931 Hugh Otter-Barry
1959 Alan Rogers
1966 Edwin Curtis
1976 Ghislain Emmanuel
1978 Trevor Huddleston
1984 Rex Donat
2001 Ian Ernest
2020 Joseph Sténio André

References

 
Mauritius
1854 establishments in the British Empire